Oxford was a parliamentary constituency in the United Kingdom. It comprised the city of Oxford in the county of Oxfordshire, and elected two members of parliament from its creation in 1295 until 1885 when its representation was reduced to one member by the Redistribution of Seats Act 1885.

During the 1960s and 1970s, Oxford was a marginal seat.

Boundaries and boundary changes
1918–1950: The County Borough of Oxford. The boundaries were expanded to coincide with the County Borough.

1950–1983: As above, with redrawn boundaries. Areas which had been absorbed by the County Borough of Oxford, including Cowley and Headington, transferred from the Henley constituency.  Small area in the north also transferred from Banbury.

In the 1983 redistribution, this constituency was abolished and was split into two new, separate constituencies: Oxford East, and Oxford West and Abingdon.  The City of Oxford local government district had replaced the County Borough of Oxford on 1 April 1974, under the terms of the Local Government Act 1972, and the redistribution reflected this.  Despite Oxford West and Abingdon including Oxford city centre, Oxford East included the majority of the new district. The city centre has been in the redrawn Oxford East since 2010.

Members of Parliament

1295–1640

1640–1885

1885–1983

Elections

Elections in the 1830s

Stonor's election was declared void on petition, causing a by-election.

Elections in the 1840s

Elections in the 1850s
Wood was appointed Solicitor General for England and Wales, requiring a by-election.

Wood resigned after being appointed Vice-Chancellor, causing a by-election.

 

Neate's election was declared void on petition due to bribery, causing a by-election.

 

 

Cardwell was appointed Chief Secretary to the Lord Lieutenant of Ireland, requiring a by-election.

Elections in the 1860s
Cardwell was appointed Chancellor of the Duchy of Lancaster, requiring a by-election.

Langston's death caused a by-election.

Cardwell was appointed Secretary of State for the Colonies, requiring a by-election.

  
 

Cardwell was appointed Secretary of State for War, requiring a by-election.

Elections in the 1870s
Harcourt was appointed Solicitor General for England and Wales, causing a by-election.

  

Cardwell succeeded to the peerage, becoming Viscount Cardwell and causing a by-election.

Elections in the 1880s

 

Harcourt was appointed Home Secretary, requiring a by-election.

Hall's election was declared void, on account of bribery, and the writ was suspended.

In 1881, Chitty was appointed a judge and resigned the seat. However, as the writ was suspended, no by-election was held and the seat was left without an MP until 1885, when representation was also reduced to one member.

Elections in the 1890s

Chesney's death caused a by-election.

Annesley's appointment as Comptroller of the Household, requiring a by-election.

Elections in the 1900s

Elections in the 1910s

Elections in the 1920s

Elections in the 1930s

Elections in the 1940s 
General Election 1939–40:

Another General Election was required to take place before the end of 1940. The political parties had been making preparations for an election to take place and by Autumn 1939, the following candidates had been selected; 
Conservative: Quintin Hogg
Labour: Patrick Gordon-Walker
Liberal: William Brown

Elections in the 1950s 

+0.69%

Elections in the 1960s

Elections in the 1970s

References

Election results, 1951–1979
Robert Beatson, A Chronological Register of Both Houses of Parliament (London: Longman, Hurst, Res & Orme, 1807) 
D. Brunton & D. H. Pennington, Members of the Long Parliament (London: George Allen & Unwin, 1954)
Cobbett's Parliamentary history of England, from the Norman Conquest in 1066 to the year 1803 (London: Thomas Hansard, 1808) 
F W S Craig, British Parliamentary Election Results 1832–1885 (2nd edition, Aldershot: Parliamentary Research Services, 1989)
Craig, F. W. S. (1983). British parliamentary election results 1918–1949 (3 ed.). Chichester: Parliamentary Research Services. .
 Maija Jansson (ed.), Proceedings in Parliament, 1614 (House of Commons) (Philadelphia: American Philosophical Society, 1988) 
J. E. Neale, The Elizabethan House of Commons (London: Jonathan Cape, 1949)

Oxford (UK Parliamentary constituency)
Parliamentary constituencies in Oxfordshire (historic)
Politics of Oxford
Constituencies of the Parliament of the United Kingdom disestablished in 1983